Hiram College is a private liberal arts college in Hiram, Ohio. It was founded in 1850 as the Western Reserve Eclectic Institute by Amos Sutton Hayden and other members of the Disciples of Christ Church. The college is nonsectarian and coeducational. It is accredited by the Higher Learning Commission. Hiram's most famous alumnus is James A. Garfield, who served as a college instructor and principal before he was elected the 20th President of the United States.

History
On June 12, 1849, representatives of the Disciples of Christ voted to establish an academic institution, which would later become Hiram College. On November 7 that year, they chose the village of Hiram as the site for the school because the founders considered this area of the Western Reserve to be "healthful and free of distractions". The following month, on December 20, the founders accepted the suggestion of Isaac Errett and named the school the Western Reserve Eclectic Institute.

The institute's original charter was authorized by the state legislature on March 1, 1850, and the school opened several months later, on November 27. Many of the students came from the surrounding farms and villages of the Western Reserve, but Hiram soon gained a national reputation and students began arriving from other states. On February 20, 1867, the Institute incorporated as a college and changed its name to Hiram College.

During the years before it was renamed Hiram College, 1850–1867, the school had seven principals, the equivalent of today's college presidents. The two that did the most in establishing and defining the nature of the institution were Disciple minister Amos Sutton Hayden, who led the school through its first six years, and James A. Garfield, who had been a student at the institute from 1851 to 1853 and then returned in 1856 as a teacher. As principal, Garfield expanded the institute's curriculum. He left the Institute in 1861 and in 1880 was elected the 20th President of the United States.

In 1870, one of Garfield's best friends and former students, Burke A. Hinsdale, was appointed Hiram's president. Although there were two before him, Hinsdale is considered the college's first permanent president because the others served only briefly. The next president to have a major impact on the college was Ely V. Zollars, who increased enrollment significantly, established a substantial endowment and created a program for the construction of campus buildings. Later presidents who served for at least 10 years were Miner Lee Bates, Kenneth I. Brown, Paul H. Fall, Elmer Jagow, and G. Benjamin Oliver.

In 1931, shortly before Hiram celebrated the 100th anniversary of Garfield's birth, there was a debate in the community about changing the name of the school to Garfield College. There were strong advocates on both sides of the issue. Among the 2,000 guests at the centennial celebration were three generations of Garfield's family, including two of his sons. The idea of changing the college's name was not mentioned at the event and the idea was abandoned.

Principals and presidents

The following is a list of the school's leaders since its founding in 1850.

Principals (Western Reserve Eclectic Institute)
1850–1856 – Amos Sutton Hayden
1857–1861 – James A. Garfield
1861–1864 – Harvey W. Everest (Pro Tem)
1864–1865 – C. W. Heywood (acting)
1865–1866 – Adoniram J. Thomson (managing)
1866–1867 – John M. Atwater

Presidents (Hiram College)
1867–1868 – Silas E. Shepard (acting)
1868–1870 – John M. Atwater (acting)
1870–1882 – Burke A. Hinsdale
1883–1887 – George M. Laughlin
1887–1888 – Colman Bancroft (acting)
1888–1902 – Ely V. Zollars
1902–1903 – James A. Beattie
1903–1905 – Edmund B. Wakefield (acting)
1905–1907 – Carlos C. Rowlison
1907–1930 – Miner Lee Bates
1930–1940 – Kenneth I. Brown
1940–1957 – Paul H. Fall
1957–1965 – Paul F. Sharp
1965–1965 – James N. Primm
1966–1966 – Wendell G. Johnson (acting)
1966–1985 – Elmer Jagow
1986–1989 – Russell Aiuto
1989–1989 – James Norton (interim)
1990–2000 – G. Benjamin Oliver
2000–2002 – Richard J. Scaldini
2003–2014 – Thomas V. Chema
2014–2020 – Lori E. Varlotta
2020–present - David P. Haney

Academics

As of the 2019–20 academic year, Hiram's student body consists of 1,116 undergraduates from 27 states and 11 foreign countries. Of the 81 full–time faculty, 95% hold a Ph.D. or other terminal degree in their field.

Hiram specializes in the education of undergraduate students, though the college does have a small graduate program. Hiram confers the BA, BSN, and MA degrees. The college offers 33 majors and 40 minors for traditional undergraduates, in addition to pre-professional programs for specific fields. Interdisciplinary studies have also been a part of Hiram's curriculum for decades.

Hiram's curriculum requires all students to complete one course in each of nine academic areas: creative methods, interpretive methods, modeling methods, experimental scientific methods, social and cultural analysis, experiencing the world, understanding diversity at home, interdisciplinary, and ethics and social responsibility. Its education plan also includes international study and independent study opportunities, and faculty–guided research projects. Currently, almost all majors require some form of extensive independent project or apprenticeship experience.

Hiram's academic program consists of five schools: Arts, Humantities & Culture; Business & Communication; Education, Civil Leadership & Social Change; Health & Medical Humanities; and Science & Technology.

The college's curriculum is currently marketed under the name Hiram Connect, which involves four steps: First Year Colloquium/Foundations of the Liberal Arts, Declaration of Major, Experiential Learning, and a Capstone Project.

Hiram has five "Centers of Distinction" for interdisciplinary studies: Center for Integrated Entrepreneurship, Center for Scientific Engagement, Center for Literature and Medicine, Garfield Institute for Public Leadership, and Lindsay-Crane Center for Writing and Literature.

Rankings
Hiram was ranked #167 among National Liberal Arts Colleges by U.S. News & World Report in 2012. At the same time, Hiram is currently ranked #67 among Liberal Arts Colleges by Washington Monthly. Also, in 2018, Forbes ranked Hiram at #644 among all colleges and universities in the U.S, and #29 in Ohio. Hiram has regularly been included in The Princeton Review Best Colleges guide, and is one of only 40 schools included in Loren Pope's book Colleges That Change Lives.

Hiram is a member of the Annapolis Group, which has been critical of the college rankings process. Hiram is among the signatories of the Presidents Letter.

Student life

Athletics
The school's sports teams are called the Terriers. They participate in NCAA Division III and the North Coast Athletic Conference. In men's volleyball, a sport not sponsored by the NCAC, Hiram competes in the Allegheny Mountain Collegiate Conference.

The Hiram College basketball team won the gold medal in the collegiate division of the 1904 Summer Olympics in St. Louis. It was the first time that basketball was part of an Olympics; it was included as a demonstration sport and no foreign teams participated.

The Cleveland Browns held their training camp at Hiram College from 1952 through 1974, making it the longest–tenured training site in the team's history.

The 2014 Hiram vs. Mount St. Joseph women's basketball game was named the Best Moment at the 2015 ESPY Awards. The game featured terminally ill Mount St. Joseph player Lauren Hill in the first of her four college games, which set the all-time attendance record for an NCAA women's game below the Division I level.

Residence life
The college's residential complexes include Booth-Centennial, East Hall, Whitcomb Hall, Miller Hall, Bowler Hall, and the Townhouses.

Student clubs and organizations

Student Senate is the elected student governing body of the college. It serves as a liaison between students and the school's administration, and oversees all student clubs and organizations, collectively called the Associated Student Organizations (ASO). The Kennedy Center Programming Board (KCPB) falls under the auspices of Student Senate, and is responsible for planning educational, social, recreational, and cultural programs.

Hiram has close to 70 registered student clubs and organizations in eight categories: Academic, Greek Social, Musical, Political and Activism, Publications and Communications, Religious, Special Interest and Service, and Sports and Recreation. Fraternities and sororities are not permitted on campus, but there are six Greek social clubs: Delta Chi Lambda, Kappa Sigma Pi, Lambda Lambda Lambda, Phi Beta Gamma, Phi Gamma Epsilon, Phi Kappa Chi, and Greek Social.

Since 1971, Hiram has maintained a chapter of Phi Beta Kappa, the national honor society for the liberal arts. The school has also had a chapter of Omicron Delta Kappa (ODK), a national leadership honor society, since 1962.

Notable alumni and faculty

 Jean Ankeney – politician, nurse
 Edna Allyn – first librarian of the Hawaii State Library
 Miner Searle Bates – historian, and college professor and administrator
 Laura Bell – author
 Robert Biscup – orthopaedic surgeon
 Howard Junior Brown – physician, gay rights advocate
 Henry Lawrence Burnett – lawyer
 Allen R. Bushnell – U.S. Representative
 Russell L. Caldwell – historian and college professor
 James Anson Campbell – industrialist
 Sharon Creech – author
 Martha Derthick – academic
 Fritz Dreisbach – artist
 Virginia Fraser – elder rights activist
 James A. Garfield – 20th President of the United States
 Lucretia Rudolph Garfield – First Lady of the United States
 Franklin L. Gilson – jurist and politician
 Osee M. Hall – U.S. Representative
 Pamela Helming - New York State Senator
 Ammon Hennacy –  Christian pacifist, anarchist, and member of the Catholic Worker Movement
 David Brendan Hopes – author, playwright, and poet
 Jan Hopkins – anchor, CNNfn
 Deborah Joseph – computer scientist
 John Samuel Kenyon – linguist
 Frank Laporte – Major League baseball player, second baseman

 Vachel Lindsay – poet
 Lance Liotta – cancer biologist
 J. Kevin McMahon – President and CEO, Pittsburgh Cultural Trust
 Louis Mink – philosopher of history and college professor
 Horace Ladd Moore – U.S. Representative
 Wendy Murray – journalist
 Carol Z. Perez – U.S. Ambassador to Chile
 Augustus Herman Pettibone – U.S. Representative
 Benjamin D. Pritchard – Brevetted Brigadier General, United States Army
 Dean A. Scarborough – chief executive officer of Avery Dennison Corporation
 Platt Rogers Spencer – originator, Spencarian penmanship
 Mark W. Spong – roboticist
 Michael Stanley – singer–songwriter, musician, and radio personality
 Claude Steele – social psychologist, college professor, and college administrator
 Howard F. Taylor – sociologist
 Emma Rood Tuttle — writer, poet
 Allyn Vine – physicist and oceanographer
 P. H. Welshimer – minister
 Tom Wesselmann – artist
 John J. Whitacre – U.S. Representative
 Bill White – Major League Baseball player and broadcaster; President, National League
 Dempster Woodworth – editor, politician and physician
 Laurin D. Woodworth – U.S. Representative
 Harold Bell Wright – author
 Allyn Abbott Young – economist

References

External links

 Official website
 Official athletics website

 
Private universities and colleges in Ohio
Hiram College
Universities and colleges affiliated with the Christian Church (Disciples of Christ)
Educational institutions established in 1850
Buildings and structures in Portage County, Ohio
Western Reserve, Ohio
Universities and colleges accredited by the Higher Learning Commission